Dilbar is a super-yacht launched on 14 November 2015 at the German Lürssen shipyard and delivered in 2016. She was built as Project Omar. The interior design of Dilbar was designed by Andrew Winch and the exterior by Espen Oeino.

As of 2022, Dilbar is the sixth longest yacht in the world.

The yacht was owned by Russian billionaire and oligarch Alisher Usmanov. In March 2022, the yacht was seized by German authorities as part of a series of sanctions on Russian oligarchs during the 2022 Russian invasion of Ukraine. The yacht is reported to have cost $600 million, employ 84 full-time crew members, and contain the largest indoor swimming pool installed on a superyacht at 180 cubic metres. Usmanov previously owned, another, smaller yacht also named Dilbar (renamed Al Raya in 2018).

History

Seizing by German government (2022)

Forbes reported that on March 2, 2022, Dilbar was seized by the German government as part of sanctions against Usmanov stemming from the 2022 Russian invasion of Ukraine. Dilbar was docked and undergoing refit at Blohm+Voss shipyard in Hamburg since October 2021. This was later denied by the German authorities, who clarified that the yacht was not seized, but was covered by export control sanctions, meaning that Dilbar will not be able to leave Germany without special permission. 

At the beginning of the war, the Dilbar was in Hamburg at the Blohm + Voss shipyard. The ship was placed on a dry dock and should be overhauled.

The exact legal ownership of Dilbar has been obscured. In April 2022, German federal police announced they'd investigated the yacht and found the yacht belonged to Usmanov's sister, who was also under sanctions along with her brother. Investigations by the German Federal Criminal Police Office (BKA) and the tax investigation office determined Gulbahor Ismailova as the owner. She is the sister of the Russian oligarch and Putin confidant Alisher Usmanov. Ismailovas name was not on any sanctions list until then. The BKA informed the German Foreign Office about the new findings and Ismailova was then sanctioned as well, in April 2022. German authorities seized the yacht. When seized as an asset of Usmanov, in June 2022 Dilbar was valued at "as much as $750 million."

German authorities are looking for other property and assets of Usmanov that could be frozen and seized. Several villas on the Bavarian Tegernsee are said to belong to the oligarch.

Ship and design 

In April 2022, Dilbar was considered by Lürssen to be the largest motor yacht in the world by gross tonnage, measuring some 511 feet and 15,917 tons. She has two helipads and "one of the biggest indoor pools ever installed on a yacht." She was named after Alisher Usmanov's mother.

Dilbar features a steel displacement hull with an aluminum superstructure, and teak decks. The yacht was built to conform to Lloyd's Register classification society rules, and meets SOLAS (Safety of Life at Sea) requirements. 

The ship is registered in the Cayman Islands.

See also
 List of motor yachts by length
 List of yachts built by Lürssen

References

External link 

2015 ships
Motor yachts
Ships built in Germany
Ships built in Bremen (state)
Russian entities subject to the U.S. Department of the Treasury sanctions